The American Society of Clinical Oncology (ASCO) is a professional organization representing physicians of all oncology sub-specialties who care for people with cancer. Founded in 1964 by Fred Ansfield, Harry Bisel, Herman Freckman, Arnoldus Goudsmit, Robert Talley, William Wilson, and Jane C. Wright, it has nearly 45,000 members worldwide.

Physician education

ASCO offers educational resources for cancer physicians and other health care professionals of clinical oncology. These include scientific meetings, educational conferences, professional workshops, and special symposia on issues of particular relevance and importance to oncologists and researchers.  It also produced the patient information website, Cancer.Net.

It publishes numerous journals, books, newsletters, and online and multimedia resources; it publishes the Journal of Clinical Oncology (JCO),  the JCO Oncology Practice (JCO OP), and the JCO Global Oncology (JCO GO),  JCO Clinical Cancer Informatics, which publishes clinically relevant research based on biomedical informatics methods and processes applied to cancer-related data, information, and images, and JCO Precision Oncology, which publishes original research, reports, opinions, and reviews related to precision oncology and genomics-driven care of patients with cancer.

ASCO also publishes special curricula to address the specific educational needs of cancer professionals.

Publications
Journal of Clinical Oncology
JCO Oncology Practice
JCO Global Oncology
JCO Clinical Cancer Informatics
JCO Precision Oncology
ASCO Connection
"The ASCO Post"

Initiatives 

Created by members of ASCO, the Conquer Cancer Foundation of ASCO is a 501(c)(3) charitable organization. Since the inception of its grants and awards program in 1984, Conquer Cancer has awarded more than $90 million in funding through nearly 1,500 grants and awards to researchers in 65 countries. In 2015, the foundation launched The Campaign to Conquer Cancer, a comprehensive campaign to raise $150 million to fund cancer research, support Conquer Cancer's top priorities, and bring national awareness to the Foundation.

ASCO's patient information website, Cancer.Net, is supported by the Conquer Cancer Foundation of ASCO. CancerLinQ is ASCO's data platform initiative. It was created to give oncologists a robust quality monitoring system that collects and analyzes data from all patient encounters to improve quality of care. ASCO published its Value Framework in 2015  and updated it in 2016. This provides physicians and patients with a tool to assess and compare the value of different drugs in an era of skyrocking anticancer drug costs.

See also 
 American Cancer Society
 American Association for Cancer Research

References

External links 
American Society of Clinical Oncology
Conquer Cancer Foundation
CancerLinQ™
Cancer.Net
ASCO University
Journal of Clinical Oncology
Journal of Oncology Practice
Journal of Global Oncology
JCO Clinical Cancer Informatics
JCO Precision Oncology
ASCO Connection

Cancer organizations based in the United States
Medical associations based in the United States
Organizations established in 1964
Medical and health organizations based in Virginia